Igor Ferreira Alves (born 21 February 1985 in Brazil) is a Brazilian footballer who was last known to be playing for Hougang United FC of the Singapore S.League.

Career

Spending his football career in the lower leagues of Spain, precisely six years, Alves was childhood teammates with then Hougang player Geison Moura in Brazil and reunited with him when he signed for them in mid 2014. A fan of Real Madrid, Alves counts Brazilian defender Lucio among his favorite footballers and was given the number 22 jersey upon arriving in Singapore, promising to work hard for the supporters.

A UEFA 'A' License holder, Alves holds  dual Brazilian and Spanish nationality due to the time that he spent playing football in Spain which bears some semblance to Brazilian legends Roberto Carlos, Marcelo, and Ronaldo.

References

External links
 at Soccerway

Association football defenders
Living people
1985 births
Brazilian footballers
Brazilian expatriate footballers
Footballers from São Paulo
Hougang United FC players
Expatriate footballers in Singapore
Singapore Premier League players
Expatriate soccer players in Australia